The Sturt Street Gardens is a central reservation running along Sturt Street, one of the main thoroughfares of Ballarat, (Victoria, Australia).

The historic gardens are the main gardens of Ballarat's Central Business District and significant for their heritage features including significant statues, bandstands, memorials and trees.   Three of the reserve's monuments are listed on the Victorian Heritage Register and the entire gardens are listed as a heritage precinct by the City of Ballarat. The gardens are important to the culture of Ballarat.

Several blocks along the gardens have individual names based on their history and features such as Queen Victoria Square and Alexandra Square.

History 
Sturt Street, the main boulevarde of Ballarat, was created by the first survey of the town in 1851 by WS Urquhart.  In the 1860s a dual carriageway with central median strip was created.

Victorian Heritage Register Sites

Titanic Memorial Bandstand

The SS Titanic Memorial Bandstand is an excellent and unusual example of creative bandstand design of the Edwardian period, a picturesque composition with dominant roofs of oriental character, it is an exotic and important element of the streetscape of Sturt Street.

Constructed in 1915, it is one of the few remaining examples of what was once a building type found commonly in the parks and gardens of many municipalities. It serves as a tangible reminder of a highly popular form of entertainment, prominent on the community agenda for many years. The construction of the bandstand and its survival until now also reflects the place of music in Ballarat's cultural identity and the continuing prominence of music in the community.

The bandstand and its construction is indicative of Ballarat's self-image and patriotic fervour.

Queen Alexandra Bandstand
The Alexandra Bandstand is a typical and well resolved example of creative bandstand design; it polygonal form surmounted by a 'Moorish' onion dome is representative of bandstands of this period. The bandstand has particularly fine wrought iron detailing incorporating musical motifs and is an important and exotic element of the streetscape of Sturt Street.

Built in 1908 during the heyday of the band movement, it is now one of the few remaining examples of bandstands in Victoria. It serves as a tangible reminder of a highly popular form of entertainment, prominent on the community agenda for many years. The construction of the bandstand and its survival until now also reflects the prominence of music in Ballarat's cultural and civic identity.

Statues
The City of Ballarat has a walk of the statues within the Sturt Street Gardens.

The main statues in order from West to East are:
 Peterson Fountain 1923
 George Treloar Memorial 2019 Sculptor: Lis Johnson
 Mother Earth 1952 Sculptor: George H. Allen
 Peter Lalor 1893 Sculptor: Nelson McLean
 Sir Albert Coates 2000 Sculptor: Louis Laumen
 King George V Monument 1938 Sculptor: Victor Greenhalgh
 Ruth 1899 Sculptor: Charles F. Summers
 Hebe 1899 Sculptor: B. Raggi
 Thomas Moore 1889 Sculptor: George Grant
 Queen Victoria Memorial Fountain 1902, Sculptor: F. W. Commons
 Queen Victoria 1900 Sculptor Sir Edgar Bertram MacKennal
 Robert Burns 1867 Sculptor: John Udny
 Point to Sky 2002 Sculptor: Akio Makigawa

Memorials and monuments
 Gordon Memorial 1969, Sculptor: Raymond B. Ewers
 Cenotaph 1949, Architect: John P. Shimmin
 Eternal Flame 1995, Sculptor: Peter Blizzard
 Korean, Borneo, Malayan, Vietnam War Memorial 2000
 William Dunstan Victoria Cross Memorial 2000
 King George V Monument 1938, Sculptor: Victor Greenhalgh
 Phoenix Foundry Plaque
 Queen Victoria Memorial Fountain 1902, Sculptor: F. W. Commons
 Boer War Memorial 1906, Sculptor: James White
 Burke & Wills Fountain 1867
 SS Titanic Memorial Bandstand 1915, Architect: G.W. Clegg
 Pioneer Miners Monument 1951
 James Galloway Monument 1880

Gallery

References

External links

Sculpture gardens, trails and parks in Australia
Gardens in Victoria (Australia)
Tourist attractions in Victoria (Australia)
Ballarat
Victorian Heritage Register Grampians (region)
RMS Titanic memorials